The 2001 Bucknell Bison football team was an American football team that represented Bucknell University during the 2001 NCAA Division I-AA football season. Bucknell finished fourth in the Patriot League.

In their seventh and final year under head coach Tom Gadd, the Bison compiled a 6–4 record. Carson Book, Jabu Powell, Mark Tallman and Reed Tunison were the team captains.

The Bison outscored opponents 240 to 157. Bucknell's 4–3 conference record placed fourth out of eight in the Patriot League standings.

Like most of the Patriot League, Bucknell played just 10 of its 11 scheduled games, after its September 15 matchup, against Ivy League opponent Cornell, was canceled following the September 11 attacks.

Bucknell played its home games at Christy Mathewson–Memorial Stadium on the university campus in Lewisburg, Pennsylvania.

Schedule

References

Bucknell
Bucknell Bison football seasons
Bucknell Bison football